Awer Bul Mabil (born 15 September 1995) is an Australian professional soccer player. who represents the Australia national team at international level. He plays as a winger for Sparta Prague on loan from La Liga club Cádiz. 

Born a South Sudanese refugee in Kenya, Mabil played youth soccer at the South Australian National Training Centre and with Adelaide United. He made his senior debut for Campbelltown City, before making his debut in the A-League for Adelaide United in 2013.

He is co-founder of the humanitarian charity Barefoot to Boots, which aims to improve health, education, and gender equality among refugees, as well as equipping young refugees with sports equipment. In January 2023 he was named Young Australian of the Year.

Early life and education
Mabil was born on 15 September 1995 to South Sudanese parents in Kakuma, located in northwestern Kenya. He lived with his family in the Kakuma Refugee Camp until the age of 10 when they moved to Australia and settled in Adelaide.  He first began playing soccer at the Kenyan refugee camp at around the age of five, stating: "We would just go outside and start kicking around. It was not structured and there was little else to do". They played with bare feet and used a rolled-up sock as a football. During a 2022 World Cup qualifier, Mabil said "I was born in a hut, a little hut. My hotel room here is definitely bigger than the hut, the room we had as a family in that refugee camp".

Mabil attended St Columba College throughout his teenage years in Adelaide, graduating in 2013.

Club career

Youth
Mabil played in youth teams at St Augustines; Playford City; SA NTC (2010–2011); and Salisbury East Junior Soccer Club.

Adelaide United
Mabil made his senior debut at Campbelltown City (in the FFSA National Premier League) in 2012. Later that year he was signed by Adelaide United in the A-League,  after he had displayed a number of performances showing his pace and dribbling skills to outwit many defenders in the FFSA National Premier League.

He made his Adelaide United senior debut on 11 January 2013 in a 2012–13 A-League match against Perth Glory. He scored his first goal in a 2–1 away loss to Wellington Phoenix in Round 17 of the 2013–14 A-League season, after coming on as a substitute in the second half.

FC Midtjylland
In July 2015, Mabil secured a move to Danish Superliga club, FC Midtjylland for a reported transfer fee in excess of AU$1,300,000 Awer Mabil made his Danish Superliga debut for FC Midtjylland on 16 October 2015 against Randers FC at the MCH Arena in Herning as an 83rd-minute substitute for Daniel Royer. On 22 October 2015, Mabil made his UEFA Europa League debut at home to Napoli FC, coming on for Mikkel Duelund in the 73rd minute.

He has said that when he went to FC Midtjylland he began to appreciate the seriousness of the game, and to develop a winning mentality. Initially he was not getting much game time, and the club sent him to two clubs on loan to help develop his skills and a winning mindset.

Loan to Esbjerg fB
In August 2016, Mabil was loaned to Esbjerg fB to allow him to get more game time and develop. Mabil made his debut on 8 August 2016, starting the match against AGF but was sent off in the 44th minute. Esbjerg was relegated to the Danish 1st Division, and Esbjerg announced that Mabil was one of nine players who would be leaving the club.

Loan to Paços de Ferreira
In July 2017, Mabil was loaned to Paços de Ferreira to allow him further first-team opportunities. Paços de Ferreira were relegated at the end of the 2017–18 Primeira Liga season; however, Mabil impressed while on loan, scoring twice and providing a further three assists in 26 league appearances. He still follows the club.

Return to Midtjylland
Mabil returned to Denmark in 2018 a more mature player, and had a strong start, scoring a goal and registering two assists in his first six appearances of the season. On 11 November 2018, Mabil scored two and set a further two up in Midtjyllands 5–0 win over Vejle, taking his season tally to four goals and eight assists. He worked his way into the first team squad.

On 30 September 2020, he assisted Sory Kaba's headed goal with a cross in a 4–1 home win over Slavia Prague in the 2020–21 UEFA Champions League play-off round that qualified Midtjylland for their first UEFA Champions League. He scored his first Champions League goal on 25 November that year against Ajax from the penalty spot in a 3–1 defeat.

Loan to Kasımpaşa
In February 2022, after being sidelined at Midtjylland owing to his unwillingness to sign a further contract after seven years in Denmark, Mabil was loaned to Kasımpaşa in Turkey until the end of the season.

Cádiz
In May 2022, it was confirmed that Mabil had signed to Spanish La Liga club Cádiz for four seasons.

Loan to Sparta Prague
In January 2023, Mabil was loaned to Sparta Prague in the Czech Republic.

International career
In August 2013, Mabil was called up by Australia for COTIF Tournament in L'Alcúdia, Spain. The tournament was used by the FFA to prepare players for their successful 2014 AFC U-19 Championship qualification campaign.

A citizen of South Sudan by birth, he was cleared by FIFA to play for Australia in March 2014 after a year-long process to obtain a birth certificate and gain exemption from FIFA eligibility rules due to his refugee status.

He featured for Australia in the 2014 AFC U-19 Championship, playing in all three of their games, the opponents were Uzbekistan, United Arab Emirates and Indonesia.

After showing impressive form with FC Midtjylland, Mabil was called up to the senior team for the first time. Participating in the Socceroos first training camp under new coach Graham Arnold.

On 16 October 2018, Mabil made his debut for the Australia senior national team against Kuwait in an international friendly match at the Al Kuwait Sports Club Stadium. He came on as a second-half substitution for Mathew Leckie and scored his maiden goal for the senior national team in the 88th minute to give Australia their fourth and final goal in a 4–0 win over Kuwait in Graham Arnold's first match of his second stint with the Australian national team. Mabil's goal was assisted by Tomi Juric and Thomas Deng. Mabil celebrated the goal with childhood friend and fellow South Sudanese refugee Deng, who was also making his international debut for Australia. Awer dedicated the goal, post-match, to his mother.

Mabil played in qualifying matches for the 2022 World Cup. In the final "must-win" game against Peru, he scored one of the penalties that secured a place in the competition for the Socceroos. He said that scoring the crucial goal was "the only way to say thank you to Australia on behalf of my family".

On 22 September 2022, Mabil scored his first home international goal against New Zealand in a 1–0 win in a friendly at Lang Park.

Other activities

Barefoot to Boots
Mabil helped to establish the humanitarian charity Barefoot to Boots with his elder brother Awer G. Bul, and Ian Smith to ensure better "health, education, and gender equality" outcomes for refugees. Mabil returned to Kakuma with the organisation, with the aim of promoting football as well as helping refugees in other ways.

Recognition and honours
In 2018, Mabil was awarded the FIFPRO Merit Award, presented by the International Federation of Professional Footballers  at a ceremony in Rome. The award is worth worth US$25,000, to be donated to his charity to continue his work.

In June 2022, on a visit to his old school, St Columba College, Mabil was presented with the 2022 Alumni of the Year Award, in recognition of his high level of achievement in football as well as his service to the community with his Barefoot to Boots charity. 

In November 2022, Mabil was announced as recipient of the 2023 Young Australian of the Year award for his home state of South Australia. On 25 January 2023, he was named the national Young Australian of the Year.

Personal life
His elder brother is Awer G. Bul, who is director of Barefoot to Boots, which he co-founded.

Mabil's 19-year-old sister Bor was killed in a car crash in Adelaide in 2018.

He went to school with good friend, fellow-refugee and Socceroo Thomas Deng.

Career statistics

Club

International

Scores and results list Australia's goal tally first, score column indicates score after each Mabil goal.

Honours 
Adelaide United
 FFA Cup: 2014

Midtjylland
 Danish Superliga: 2019–20
 Danish Cup: 2018–19

Individual
 National Youth League Player of the Year: 2012–13
 FFA U20 Male Player of the Year: 2014
 Young Australian of the Year: 2023

References

External links 
 

1995 births
Living people
People from Rift Valley Province
Australian soccer players
Australia youth international soccer players
Australian expatriate sportspeople in Spain
Expatriate footballers in Spain
Association football forwards
A-League Men players
FFSA Super League players
Adelaide United FC players
FC Midtjylland players
Esbjerg fB players
F.C. Paços de Ferreira players
Cádiz CF players
South Sudanese emigrants to Australia
Naturalised citizens of Australia
2019 AFC Asian Cup players
Australia international soccer players
South Sudanese refugees
Sportspeople of South Sudanese descent
2022 FIFA World Cup players
Soccer players from Adelaide
Refugees in Kenya
Australian expatriate sportspeople in Denmark
Australian expatriate sportspeople in Portugal
Australian expatriate sportspeople in Turkey
Australian expatriate soccer players
La Liga players
Expatriate men's footballers in Denmark
Expatriate footballers in Portugal
Kasımpaşa S.K. footballers
Süper Lig players
Primeira Liga players
Expatriate footballers in Turkey
AC Sparta Prague players
Australian expatriate sportspeople in the Czech Republic
Expatriate footballers in the Czech Republic